Never on Tuesday is a 1989 American comedy film written and directed by Adam Rifkin. The film was released on VHS video rental by Paramount Home Entertainment in 1989 and was originally slated to be re-released in the United States on DVD format through City Light Entertainment before the company went out of business.

Plot 
Three people are stranded in the desert after Matt (Andrew Lauer) and Eddie (Peter Berg) total Tuesday's  (Claudia Christian) automobile. Tuesday is a lesbian; she is attractive, intelligent, and good natured. She is a woman with ambition and Matt and Eddie do not factor into her plans for her future. Exhibiting an immediate sexual interest in the beautiful Tuesday, the guys begin their efforts to bring her around to being attracted to one of them.

Cast 
Claudia Christian as Tuesday
Andrew Lauer as Matt
Peter Berg as Eddie
Dave Anderson as Zombie
Mark Garbarino as Zombie
Melvyn Pearls as Zombie
Brett Seals as Zombie
Nicolas Cage as Man in Red Sports Car  (uncredited)
Cary Elwes as Tow Truck Driver  (uncredited)
Emilio Estevez as Tow Truck Driver  (uncredited)
Judd Nelson as Motorcycle Cop  (uncredited)
Charlie Sheen as Thief  (uncredited)
Adam Rifkin as William  (uncredited)
Gilbert Gottfried as Lucky Larry Lupin (uncredited)

Filming 
The film was financed by Elliot Kastner.

Filming for Never on Tuesday took place in Borrego Springs, California. The cameo actors were flown out to Borrego Springs on their individual filming days including Charlie Sheen - who had just finished filming Wall Street - and Cary Elwes. The film's crew members included producer Cassian Elwes (brother of Cary) and make up artist Sheryl Berkoff. With a limited budget the cast and crew shot on film; they used 'short ends' – sections of film left over in the canister – cheap to buy but with limited use. Christian says: 'we were constantly trying to shove a 4 minute scene into a 2 minutes film stock!'

Never on Tuesday is Rifkin's directorial debut, an independent film with a small cast that features cameos from many of Rifkin's mainstays such as Cary Elwes, Judd Nelson, and Charlie Sheen. Executive Producer Cassian Elwes also worked with Rifkin on The Chase and The Dark Backward.

References

External links 
 
 

1989 films
1989 comedy films
American comedy road movies
Films set in California
Lesbian-related films
Paramount Pictures films
1980s comedy road movies
Films directed by Adam Rifkin
Films scored by Richard Stone (composer)
Films produced by Elliott Kastner
1989 directorial debut films
1980s English-language films
1980s American films